Potter P. Howard (October 4, 1890 – November 29, 1956) served consecutive two-year terms as mayor of Boise, Idaho, from 1947 to 1951. An automobile dealer when elected,  he was later an executive with the local natural gas company in Boise. Potter died in a Salt Lake City hotel while returning to Idaho from a business trip to Chicago.

Potter moved from Burley to Boise in 1935; he is buried at Morris Hill Cemetery in Boise.

References

Sources
Mayors of Boise - Past and Present
Idaho State Historical Society Reference Series, Corrected List of Mayors, 1867-1996

Mayors of Boise, Idaho
1890 births
1956 deaths
20th-century American politicians
People from Sidney, Nebraska